Ken Rich (born 1967 in Seattle, Washington, United States) is an American producer, engineer, composer and musician. He began playing violin at age five, tuba at age nine and moved on to the electric bass at age 15. After majoring in philosophy at Oberlin College while pursuing intensive jazz studies with Wendell Logan and Donald Byrd, he moved to New York City in 1991. He quickly ensconced himself in the session and live music scene of New York playing bass on David Byrne's "It Goes Back", "Offbeat - a Red Hot Soundtrip", Shabba Ranks' 1993 Grammy Award-winning album "X-Tra Naked", and Laurie Anderson's "In Our Sleep" with Lou Reed. Mr. Rich was a member of Babatunde Olatunji’s NYC-based band from 1994 until Olatunji's death in 2004.

Those sessions inspired Rich to develop his own home studios in the East Village and Brooklyn apartments where he produced Joseph Arthur’s album “Our Shadows Will Remain” which was voted Entertainment Weekly’s Album of the Year in 2004 and Chris Rubin’s (Rolling Stone) Number One album of 2004. He also co-produced Mr. Arthur’s “You’re so True” which appeared on the Grammy-nominated Shrek 2 Soundtrack. From those home studios, Mr. Rich also produced Tracy Bonham’s “Blink The Brightest” (Zoe Records), Rene Lopez's “One Man’s Year”, and Morley's “Days Like These” (Universal France) which Time magazine said “embodies modern-day NY femininity in all its multicultural finesse”.

In 2007, Ken Rich opened Grand Street Recording in Williamsburg, Brooklyn where his credits include Ani DiFranco “Red Letter Year” (Righteous Babe Records-2008), The Gutter Twins “Saturnalia” (Sub-Pop-2008), Lucinda Black Bear “Capo My Heart and Other Bear Songs” (2008), Noe Venable Summer Storm Journals (2008), Fionnn O’Lochlainn “Spawn of the Beast” (2008), The Compulsions EPs Laughter From Below (2004), Demon Love-2008, and High as Hell (2009), William Hart Strecker “Smoke and Clouds” (2005) and “All This Dreaming” (2007), Ward White “”Pulling Out” (2008), Greg Tannen “Rocket” (2008), The Key Party's Hit or Miss,  named CMJ album of the day (CMJ 2007) and the SF Chronicle's Download of the Week in 2007. and “My Blacks Don’t Match” (2009), and the Brooklyn Boogaloo Blowout's 7” ep featuring Leah Siegel (2009),

In 2008, Rich's score and sound design for Alex Lyras's play “The Common Air” were nominated for 2008 Garland Awards and won the 2008 Ovation Award for Intimate Theater and the 2008 L.A. Drama Critics Circle Award for Sound Design.

Ken Rich continues to produce, engineer, mix, master and still plays an occasional bass gig.

References

External links
Grand Street Recording
The Common Air

1967 births
Living people
American male musicians
Oberlin College alumni